The Jamaica national netball team travelled to New Zealand in September 2022 for a two-match series against the New Zealand national netball team. The two teams contested the Taini Jamison Trophy.

Background
The series was originally scheduled to be held across three test matches, with the first two matches to be played at the Globox Arena in Hamilton on 17 and 18 September, with the third match at the Eventfinda Stadium in Auckland on 21 September.

However passport and visa issues affecting the Jamaican team caused the series to be reduced to two matches, with both matches held in Auckland.

Jamaica originally announced an understrength squad with 2022 Commonwealth Games silver medalists Jhaniele Fowler and Shamera Sterling unavailable for the tour because of in-person university requirements. A number of other players were also missing through injury.

Due to the travel issues encountered by the Jamaican team, the squad was further reduced below the mandatory 10 player squad for a recognised international match, with Jamaica adding coach Connie Francis to the team sheet. They also added retired 38-year-old Carla Borrego, and Romelda Aiken (who had given birth six weeks earlier) to the squad.

Squads

Match officials

Umpires

Umpire Appointments Panel

Matches

First Test

Second Test

See also
Taini Jamison

References

2022
2022 in New Zealand netball
International netball competitions hosted by New Zealand
New Zealand national netball team series
September 2022 sports events in New Zealand
2022 in Jamaican sport